Milly, Molly is a series of New Zealand children's books by Gill Pittar. It is about the adventures of two little girls from different ethnic backgrounds, and the books promote the acceptance of diversity and the learning of life skills. There is an animated television series based on the books.

Background
The books were inspired by a double-ended doll created in 1995 by Gill Pittar to promote tolerance and communication. Following the success of the dolls, she began writing books about the characters with the first book published in 2000.

Milly, Molly books have since been translated into 40 languages.

Characters
 Milly Mandara (voiced by Madeleine Flood) is a young girl who is best friends with Molly Horren.
 Molly Horren (voiced by Savannah Lind) is a young girl who is best friends with Milly Mandara.
 Tom Baxter (voiced by Jeff Bernard) is a classmate who plays in the school soccer team and he is best friends with Jack Kurawzami.
 Alfred (Alf) Swilgregsian is a new boy from a different country (most likely Germany, Austria or Switzerland). Humphrey Carmichael did not get along with him at first, but they become best friends after Alf comforted him by teaching him a lesson about individuality.
 Sophie Da Lize is a girl who loves chocolate and is best friends with Elizabeth Smith.
 Elizabeth Smith is a girl who has very neat writing and is best friends with Sophie Da Lize.
 Megan (Meg) Costello is a girl who likes apples and is meticulous.
 Harry Grainger is a boy who has two pet mice called Brian and Brioni. Brian and Brioni had a litter of nine baby mice in "Harry's Mouse".
 Humphrey Carmichael is a boy who often teases Milly and Molly. He likes robots, dinosaurs and outer space. He has a doberman called "Zoltan" who he speaks in "Martian" too. 
 George Goodrige is a boy who likes oranges and has a pet skunk named Stinky.
 Joe Foreson Jr is a boy who has a pet hermit crab.
 Chloe Ventura is a snobby girl who has a pet horse named Prince.
 Ellie Zelig is a blind girl who befriends Milly and Molly. She only appeared in one episode.
  Bobby-Benjamin Brown (B.B Brown) is a boy who appeared in only one episode. Milly Anderson and Molly Kannetté changed his thieving way.
 Heidi Hillbilly (Heidi Untidy) is a girl who is always untidy. She only appeared in one episode. The girls (Milly and Molly) cleaned her room with her and Heidi Untidy is very cool with a bright imagination.
Family- Thomas Anderson (Milly's father): he does not really like Marmalade as much as Milly does.
 Catherine Anderson (Milly's mother): She tries to reconcile Marmalade and Milly's father.
 Chris Kannetté (Molly's father): He loves yoga.
 Lindsay Kannetté (Molly's mother): She does not like mice.

TV adaptation
Milly, Molly, a Singapore-New Zealand co-produced animated TV series based on the books, was produced in 2008. An agreement for a second season was made in early 2009. The two young actors, Savannah Lind and Madeline Flood, worked on the TV show. The voice of Aunt Maude was Cornelia Frances. Produced for the Australian Broadcasting Corporation by Milly Molly Group Holdings, Scrawl Studios and Beyond Productions in association with the Media Development Authority of Singapore

References

External links
Milly, Molly Official website

New Zealand children's books
Series of children's books
Fictional children
Children's books about friendship